The 2022 FIBA Women's Basketball World Cup Final was a basketball game that took place on 1 October 2022 at the Sydney SuperDome in Sydney, Australia, to determine the winner of the 2022 FIBA Women's Basketball World Cup.

The United States defeated China to capture their fourth consecutive and eleventh overall title.

Road to the final

Match details

References

Final
2022 FIBA Basketball World Cup Final
2022 FIBA Basketball World Cup Final
World